Anthene emkopoti, the Mkpot ciliate blue, is a butterfly in the family Lycaenidae. It is found in Nigeria (south and the Cross River loop) and western Cameroon. The habitat consists of forests.

References

Butterflies described in 1998
Anthene